The 2013 Australian Goldfields Open was a professional ranking snooker tournament that took place between 8–14 July 2013 at the Bendigo Stadium in Bendigo, Australia. It was the second ranking event of the 2013/2014 season.

Michael White attempted a maximum break in his qualifying match against Nigel Bond, but he missed the final black at 140. With this he became the fifth player along with Mark Selby, Ken Doherty, Barry Pinches and Robin Hull to do so in a professional tournament.

Shaun Murphy criticised his fellow professionals after eight of the top 16 players and reigning world champion Ronnie O'Sullivan decided not to register for the event. Another top 16 player, Ding Junhui, withdrew from the tournament at the last minute due to a passport issue.

Barry Hawkins was the defending champion, but he lost 4–5 against Tom Ford in the last 16.

Marco Fu won his second ranking title by defeating Neil Robertson 9–6 in the final.

Prize fund
The total prize money of the event was raised to $445,000 from the previous year's $435,000. The breakdown of prize money for this year is shown below:

Winner: $70,000
Runner-up: $30,000
Semi-final: $20,000
Quarter-final: $15,000
Last 16: $10,000
Last 32: $7,500
Last 48: $1,600
Last 64: $750
Last 96: $150

Non-televised highest break: $100
Televised highest break: $2,500
Total: $445,000

Wildcard round
These matches were played in Bendigo on 8 July.

Main draw

Final

Qualifying
These matches were held between 30 May and 3 June 2013 at The Capital Venue in Gloucester, England. In the match between Barry Pinches and Simon Bedford a 19-year-old record from the qualifying stage of the 1994 British Open was broken. The match lasted 449 minutes and 46 seconds, the longest ever best-of-nine-frame match in the history of professional snooker. The previous record was 434 minutes and 12 seconds in the match between Ian Williamson and Robby Foldvari.

Century breaks

Qualifying stage centuries

 141  Paul Davison
 140  Michael White
 137  }Stuart Carrington
 136, 102  Scott Donaldson
 133, 100  Ryan Day
 130  Alfie Burden
 128  Joel Walker
 126  Tian Pengfei
 124  Thepchaiya Un-Nooh
 117  Simon Bedford
 115  John Astley
 115  Mark Joyce
 114, 108, 100  Ashley Carty
 112  Luca Brecel
 111  Tony Drago
 110  Kurt Maflin
 109  Jamie Cope
 107  Jak Jones
 101  David Grace
 100  Craig Steadman

Televised stage centuries

 138, 125, 111, 102, 102  Neil Robertson
 137  Rory McLeod
 136  Alfie Burden
 135  Martin Gould
 131, 130, 115, 102, 102  Marco Fu
 129  Shaun Murphy
 128  Tom Ford
 124, 112  Paul Davison
 123, 112  Robert Milkins
 122  Michael White
 116  Ken Doherty
 112  Dominic Dale
 109  Ryan Day
 104  Mark Davis

References

External links
 2013 Australian Goldfields Open – Pictures by Tai Chengzhe at Facebook

2013
Australian Goldfields Open
Goldfields Open
Sport in Bendigo